Joe Kelly (7 June 1907 – 17 June 1998) was an Australian rules footballer who played with Carlton in the Victorian Football League before becoming a coach. 

Kelly was a left footed wingman with considerable pace and played 137 games for Carlton between 1926 and 1934. He began his coaching career in 1937 with Footscray where he took over from Syd Coventry mid-season. The following year he led the club to their first ever finals appearance, finishing the home and away season in third position. He moved to South Melbourne in 1941 and in 1942 led them all the way to the Preliminary Final where they went down to eventual premiers Essendon.

References

External links

Coaching record

1907 births
Carlton Football Club players
Western Bulldogs coaches
Sydney Swans coaches
Old Xaverians Football Club players
People educated at Xavier College
Australian rules footballers from Victoria (Australia)
1998 deaths